Tian Qi(田琪) is a Chinese woman cricketer. Tian Qi made her international debut at the 2015 ICC Women's World Twenty20 Qualifier. She is one of the current members of the Chinese women's cricket team.

References

External links 

Profile at CricHQ

Chinese women cricketers
Living people
Year of birth missing (living people)